Geriatric Nursing is a peer-reviewed healthcare journal covering the specialty of geriatric nursing published by Elsevier. It is the official journal of the Assisted Living Nurses Association, the National Gerontological Nursing Association, and the Gerontological Advanced Practice Nurses Association. The journal is abstracted and indexed in MEDLINE/PubMed and CINAHL. The journal was established in 1980 and the editor-in-chief is Barbara Resnick.

References

External links 
 

English-language journals
Monthly journals
Gerontological nursing journals
Publications established in 1980